Susan Hawk (born August 17, 1961 in Waukesha, Wisconsin) is a truck driver who notoriously competed in Survivor: Borneo (2000) and Survivor: All-Stars (2004). She appeared in other television shows.

Early life
Hawk was a truck driver previously residing in Palmyra, Wisconsin, when she first competed on Survivor: Borneo. Before then, she owned and managed a hunting and fishing camp in Northwestern Ontario, Canada. She previously was a horse trainer and a bartender-waitress.

Survivor

Borneo

In Borneo, Hawk was part of the alliance of the remaining Tagi tribe, which voted out every remaining member of the opposing Pagong tribe after the two tribes merged into one. As four players remained in Borneo, she, Richard Hatch, and Rudy Boesch plotted to vote Wiglesworth out, but the idea was abandoned when Wiglesworth won an Individual Immunity challenge called "Fallen Comrades", a trivia quiz mini-game about eliminated contestants. At a Tribal Council, Hawk and Hatch received two votes each. In a tiebreaker, Hawk and Hatch were disallowed to vote. Boesch and Wiglesworth voted Hawk out, making her overall the thirteenth player voted off and then the sixth jury member of the final Tribal Council, placing fourth. During the final Council, Sue called Richard a "snake" and Kelly a "rat" in her infamous speech. Hawk further said that, in Mother Nature, snake would eat a rat.

All-Stars

Hawk re-competed in All-Stars (2004) as part of the Chapera tribe. She was involved in an incident with another former Borneo player Richard Hatch, who reappeared in the same season as part of the Mogo Mogo tribe. Hawk later claimed that, during one of tribal immunity challenges, which was a balance beam mini-game, Hatch's genitals touched her as he passed her by on the course. The following day, after Hatch was voted out, Hawk resigned from the game voluntarily as she was too upset to continue. Hawk and Hatch discussed the incident in the February 27, 2004, episode of The Early Show, the following day after the Survivor episode aired the incident.

Other appearances
After Borneo, Hawk appeared as a guest co-host of Live with Regis in September 2000. She also appeared on the fourth episode (2000) of a short-lived American sitcom DAG, portraying her first guest-starring role who resembled Hawk on Survivor herself especially via dialogue, said its co-creator and executive producer Jack Burditt. She also appeared on the fourth season premiere of Son of the Beach alongside Borneo winner Richard Hatch. Hawk competed in the July 15, 2002, episode (all-reality edition) of a game show Dog Eat Dog. She won the "top dog" title and the $25,000 prize against the "dog pound" team.

After All-Stars, Hawk also competed alongside other Survivor players who were divided into male and female teams in Family Feud, aired on the week of February 14, 2005. She also competed in Battle of the Network Reality Stars (2005) as part of the "green" team, which lost to the "light blue" team in one challenge and then was eliminated.

Personal life
Hawk's barn and house are located in Clever, Missouri, as of May 2007. She has a husband since mid- or late-1980s.

Selected filmography
 Survivor: Borneo (2000) – finished in fourth place
 DAG, "The Return of Katherine Twigg" (2000) – Katherine Twigg
 Dog Eat Dog (2002) – won $25,000 and the "top dog" title
 Son of the Beach, "Penetration Island" (2002) – herself
 Survivor: All-Star (2004) – voluntarily resigned from the season
 Family Feud, Survivor week (2005) – among the female team
 Battle of the Network Reality Stars (2005) – among the "green" team, which was eliminated

References

External links
SurvivorFoxes.com profile

1961 births
Living people
People from Christian County, Missouri
People from Waukesha, Wisconsin
Survivor (American TV series) contestants